The 1944 New Mexico Lobos football team represented the University of New Mexico in the Border Conference during the 1944 college football season.  In their third season under head coach Willis Barnes, the Lobos compiled a 1–7 record (0–2 against conference opponents), finished last in the conference, and were outscored by opponents by a total of 261 to 87.

Schedule

References

New Mexico
New Mexico Lobos football seasons
New Mexico Lobos football